Xinhe is a county in the south of Hebei province, China, located on the Fuyang River, which is part of the Hai River watershed. The county is served by G20 Qingdao–Yinchuan Expressway and China National Highway 308.

Administrative divisions
There are 2 towns and 4 townships:

Towns:
Xinhe, Xunzhai

Townships:
Baishenshou Township, Jingjiazhuang Township, Xiliu Township, Renrangli Township

Climate

References

External links

County-level divisions of Hebei
Xingtai